Metahomaloptera is a small genus of hillstream loaches endemic to China.

Species
There are currently three recognized species in this genus:
 Metahomaloptera hangshuiensis C. X. Xie, G. R. Yang & L. X. Gong, 1984
 Metahomaloptera longicauda Jian Yang, X. Y. Chen & J. X. Yang, 2007
 Metahomaloptera omeiensis H. W. Chang, 1944

References

Balitoridae
Fish of China
Fish of Asia